John Edward Hawkins (November 15, 1969 – May 1, 2006), better known by his stage names Big Hawk and H.A.W.K., was an American rapper from Houston, Texas and a founding member of the late DJ Screw's rap group the Screwed Up Click.

Life and career
Born John Edward Hawkins in Houston, Texas on November 15, 1969, he grew up with a younger brother, Patrick "Fat Pat" Hawkins and two sisters. He started rapping in 1992 when Fat Pat took him to DJ Screw's house, an upcoming mixtape producer and DJ in the southern area of Houston. In April 2006 Hawk married his longtime girlfriend, Meshah Henderson. The couple had two sons.

In 1994 Hawk, Fat Pat, DJ Screw, Lil' Keke and Koldjack collaborated to form the group D.E.A. and Dead End Records (named for the dead end block of Martin Luther King Blvd where Hawk grew up in Houston). In late 1998 D.E.A. released an original independent album entitled, Screwed For Life featuring Lil' Keke, Big Pokey and the rest of the S.U.C. After the deaths of Hawk's brother (Fat Pat) and DJ Screw and the incarceration of many others SUC members, Hawk's ultimate mission and goal became keeping the "Ghetto Dream" alive. In 1999 Hawk participated in a Southside Playaz compilation album titled You Got Us Fuxxed Up, with Mike D, Claydoe and other members of the S.U.C. Hawk released his solo album, Under Hawk's Wings on Dead End Records in 2000 and had recorded with Lil' Flip, Lil' Keke, Big Moe, Z-Ro and was featured on the Lil' Troy hit "Wanna Be A Baller".

Big Hawk appeared on numerous mixtapes from artists in the Houston underground rap scene. After Screw's death in 2000, he was the main person responsible for keeping the S.U.C. together, so much so that his nickname was the Five Star General of the Screwed Up Click. He collaborated with Lil' O on the smash hit, "Back Back" Next, he partnered with Game Face Records in 2002 and released his first album under his label Ghetto Dreams Entertainment, self-titled, "HAWK". With the hit song, "U Already Know", the album charted the Billboard's list of top R&B and Rap Albums at no. 45. It was at Game Face Records where Hawk met and clicked with a young up and coming group called the GritBoyz and an artist named Starchy Archy. Hawk and Ghetto Dreams Ent. teamed up with Presidential Records in 2003 to release "A Bad Azz Mix Tape Vol. II." A year later he and Lil' Keke teamed up to release "Wreckin 2K4" with Presidential Records as well. It was around this time when the original S.U.C. members, along with M.J. (of Southside Studios) started collaborating on a group/compilation album titled "The Takeover". Trae tha Truth made an album dedicated to BIG HAWK called Life Goes On.

Hawk was featured on the popular single "Swang" by Trae that included a tribute to Fat Pat in 2005. In 2006, Hawk, along with Clint Dempsey of the U.S. National Soccer team recorded a song for Nike's "Joga Bonito" World Cup soccer promotion called "Don't Tread". He was part of Pepsi's Yahoo! "Houston Mic Pass" with Lil' Flip, Chamillionaire, Trae, Chingo Bling, Bun B, Short Dawg, Magno and Mike D. Since his death, Hawk has been featured on several tracks including Lil O's "I Do" single, "Down In Texas" off of the 2008 A.B.N. album It Is What It Is, and Big Unk's "I'ma Beast" to name a few.

On November 11, 2011, two posthumous singles were released called "Somebody Who Loves You" and "Praise God."

Death
On May 1, 2006, eight years after his younger brother Fat Pat was murdered, Hawkins was shot dead in Houston. He had arrived early at a house on Redfern Drive to play dominoes with a friend, and was alone at the time when an unknown assailant shot him multiple times. Hawkins was 36 years old. His murder remains unsolved.

Fellow Houston rapper Bun B, in an interview with the Houston Chronicle, said about Hawkins: "There were no kinks in this man's moral armor, because he was a rapper. There will be people who will take his death the wrong way, but he was a peaceful guy and a family man who had no beefs with anybody".

Discography

Studio albums

Mixtapes
2004: A Bad Azz Mix Tape Vol. II.
2005: The Incredible Hawk Undaground Volume 1 
2005: The Incredible Hawk Undaground Volume 2
2006: Since the Gray Tapes, Vol. 4
2007: Terrible Texas Dub K Six

Guest appearances

Awards and nominations

Grammy Awards
The Grammy Awards are annual awards presented by The Recording Academy to recognize outstanding achievement in the mainly English-language music industry.

!
|-
|  style="text-align:center;" rowspan="2"|2019
| rowspan="2"|"Sicko Mode"
| Best Rap Performance
| 
| style="text-align:center;" rowspan="2"| 

|-
| Best Rap Song
|

See also
Houston hip hop
List of murdered hip hop musicians
List of unsolved murders

References

External links
 H.A.W.K. at Discogs
 

1969 births
2006 deaths
2006 murders in the United States
African-American male rappers
American male rappers
Deaths by firearm in Texas
Gangsta rappers
Male murder victims
Murdered African-American people
People murdered in Texas
Rappers from Houston
Screwed Up Click members
Underground rappers
Unsolved murders in the United States
20th-century American male musicians
20th-century African-American musicians
21st-century African-American people